Iliya Velichkov (born 2 August 1956) is a former Bulgarian footballer who played as a forward.

Honours
 1979–80 Bulgarian Cup

External links
 
 

Living people
1956 births
Bulgarian footballers
Bulgaria international footballers
Association football forwards
PFC Slavia Sofia players
FC Haskovo players
FC Lokomotiv Gorna Oryahovitsa players
Cork City F.C. players
First Professional Football League (Bulgaria) players
League of Ireland players
bg:Илия Величков